Dietrich "Dieter" Hrabak (19 December 1914 – 15 September 1995) was a German Luftwaffe military aviator and wing commander during World War II. Following the war, he became a Generalmajor (major general) in the German Air Force of West Germany. As a fighter ace, he claimed 125 enemy aircraft shot down in over 1000 combat missions. The majority of his aerial victories were claimed over the Eastern Front with 16 claims over the Western Allies.

Born in Großdeuben, Hrabak grew up in the German Empire and the Weimar Republic. Following graduation from school, he volunteered for military service in the Reichsmarine in 1934. In November 1935, he transferred to the Luftwaffe. Following flight training, he was posted to a Jagdgeschwader (fighter wing). In 1939, Hrabak was made a Staffelkapitän (squadron leader) and with Jagdgeschwader 76 (JG 76—76th Fighter Wing) participated in the Invasion of Poland and Battle of France and claimed his first aerial victory on 13 May 1940. In July 1940, JG 76 was integrated into Jagdgeschwader 54 (JG 54—54th Fighter Wing). During the Battle of Britain, Hrabak was made a Gruppenkommandeur in JG 54 and awarded the Knight's Cross of the Iron Cross in October 1940. In 1941, he participated in Operation Barbarossa, the German invasion of the Soviet Union. In November 1942, Hrabak left JG 54 and was appointed Geschwaderkommodore (wing commander) of Jagdgeschwader 52 (JG 52—52nd Fighter Wing). There, following his 118th aerial victory, he was awarded the Knight's Cross of the Iron Cross with Oak Leaves on 25 November 1943. In October 1944 Hrabak, returned to JG 54, serving as its last Geschwaderkommodore until the end of the war.

Following World War II, Hrabak initially worked in the private industry. During the Wiederbewaffnung (rearmament) of West Germany, Hrabak joined the newly established German Air Force in 1955. He then went on to command the Advanced Pilot Training Center at Fürstenfeldbruck. Following further command positions, Hrabak was named NATO's Chief of Air Defense/Central Europe until becoming special manager for the Lockheed F-104 Starfighter programme. Hrabak retired in September 1970 and died on 15 September 1995.

Early life and career
Hrabak was born on 19 December 1914 in Großdeuben, part of Böhlen, in the Kingdom of Saxony, a federated state of the German Empire, the son of a real estate developer. Following his graduation from the Königin-Carola-Gymnasium, a secondary school, he volunteered for military service. On 8 April 1934, Hrabak joined the Reichsmarine, the German navy of the Weimar Republic and in November 1935 transferred to the newly emerging Luftwaffe (German air force) as an Oberfähnrich (officer candidate). On 1 April 1936, Hrabak was promoted to Leutnant (second lieutenant).

Following the Anschluss, Austria's annexation into Nazi Germany on 12 March 1938, Hrabak was posted to I. Gruppe (1st group) of Jagdgeschwader 138 (JG 138—138th Fighter Wing) stationed in Wien-Aspern also referred to as the "Wiener-Jagdgruppe" ("Vienna fighter group"). There, he was promoted to Oberleutnant (first lieutenant) on 1 January 1939 and was made Staffelkapitän (squadron leader) of 1. Staffel (1st squadron) of JG 138. On 1 May 1939, his unit I./JG 138 was re-designated I./Jagdgeschwader 76 (I./JG 76—1st group of the 76th Fighter Wing).

World War II
World War II in Europe began on Friday 1 September 1939 when German forces invaded Poland. In preparation of the invasion, I. Gruppe of JG 76 had been moved to an airfield at Stubendorf, present-day Izbicko in Poland, in mid-August 1939 and supported the German advance on the central and southern sectors of the front. On 3 September, Hrabak made a forced landing behind enemy lines following combat with PZL.23 light bombers and returned to his unit the next day.

On 14 September, I. Gruppe was withdrawn from combat operations and returned to its home airfield at Wien-Aspern where it arrived on 26 September. On 26 October, the Gruppenstab and 1. Staffel were ordered to Frankfurt Rhein-Main where it was united again with 2. and 3. Staffel on 2 November. From Frankfurt Rhein-Main, the Gruppe flew fighter protection during the "Phoney War" for the Frankfurt, Rhine and Saar region. In April 1940, I. Gruppe moved to an airfield at Mainz-Finthen, originally named Fliegerhorst Ober-Olm. The Gruppe stayed at Ober-Olm until the Battle of France began.

On 13 May 1940, he claimed his first victory, and he claimed five more victories before the Armistice of 22 June 1940. On 26 June 1940, I. Gruppe of JG 76 was moved to the airfield at Waalhaven in the Netherlands and subordinated to Jagdgeschwader 54 (JG 54—54th Fighter Wing). There, the Gruppe was tasked with providing aerial protection over the Dutch coastal area. On 5 July, I./JG 76 was officially integrated into JG 54 and was renamed to II./JG 54 and 1./JG 76 became 4./JG 54.

On 25 August 1940 during the Battle of Britain, Hrabak was made Gruppenkommandeur of II./JG 54. In consequence, Oberleutnant Hans Philipp was given command of 4./JG 54. During the Battle of Britain he added ten victories against Royal Air Force (RAF) fighters. On 21 October 1940 Hrabak was awarded the Knight's Cross of the Iron Cross. The presentation was made by Reichsmarschall Hermann Göring in his personal command train at Beauvais on 23 October.

On 29 March 1941, II./JG 54 was withdrawn from the English Channel and was ordered to Graz-Thalerhof. There the various squadrons were split up with 4. Staffel being subordinated to III. Gruppe of Jagdgeschwader 77 (JG 77—77th Fighter Wing) and ordered to Deta in Romania. On 6 April, 4. Staffel flew combat missions in the Invasion of Yugoslavia. The next day, the Staffel flew combat air patrols on the Hungarian-Yugoslavian border. On 9 April, II./JG 54 was united again at Kecskemét, Hungary and returned to Deta on 11 April. The Gruppe was withdrawn from this theater on 19 April and ordered to an airfield at Zemun near Belgrade.

Operation Barbarossa

Following the surrender of the Royal Yugoslav Army on 17 April 1941, JG 54 received orders on 3 May 1941 to turn over all Bf 109-Es so they could receive the new Bf 109-F variant. Transition training was completed at Airfield Stolp-Reitz in Pomerania. Following intensive training, the Geschwader was moved to airfields in Eastern Prussia. II. Gruppe under command of Hrabak was moved to Trakehnen on 20 June 1941. The Wehrmacht launched Operation Barbarossa, the invasion of the Soviet Union, on 22 June with II. Gruppe supporting Army Group North in its strategic goal towards Leningrad.

In early November, the Gruppe was withdrawn from the Eastern Front for a period of rest and replenishment where they were based at airfields in Döberitz, and later at Uetersen. On 20 January 1942, the Gruppe began relocating to the Eastern Front where they would be based at Siverskaya near Leningrad. In August to early September 1941, Hrabak was on home leave. He was promoted to Major (major) on 1 October 1942.

Wing commander
On 1 November 1942, Hrabak left JG 54 and took over command of Jagdgeschwader 52 (JG 52—52nd Fighter Wing) as Geschwaderkommodore (wing commander). At the time, JG 52 was based at Prokhladny and Gonschtakowka and operated over the front at the Terek River in the Northern Caucasus. Under Hrabak's leadership, JG 52 claimed its 10,000th aerial victory on 2 September 1944.

On 23 November, the Geschwaderstab (headquarters unit) of JG 52 began its retreat from the Caucasus region and moved to Maykop. There, Hrabak claimed his first aerial victory as Geschwaderkommodore on 13 December over a Petlyakov Pe-2 bomber. While the Battle of Stalingrad was coming to end, Hrabak and the Geschwaderstab were ordered to Rostov-on-Don on 20 January 1943 to organize fighter protection over the retreating Army Group A.

Hrabak was promoted to Oberstleutnant on 1 July 1943. On 2 August, Hrabak claimed his 100th victory. He was the 48th Luftwaffe pilot to achieve the century mark. On 25 November 1943, Hrabak was awarded the Knight's Cross of the Iron Cross with Oak Leaves. He was the 337th member of the German armed forces to be so honored and at the time was credited with 118 aerial victories. The presentation was made by Adolf Hitler at the Wolf's Lair, Hitler's headquarters in Rastenburg, present-day Kętrzyn in Poland, on 9 December. Also presented with awards that day by Hitler were Hauptmann Hans-Ulrich Rudel, who received the Swords to his Knight's Cross with Oak Leaves. Rudel's air gunner and radio operator Oberfeldwebel (Master Sergeant) Erwin Hentschel was honored with the Knight's Cross.

On 20 September 1944, Hrabak scored the last of his 125 victories. In October 1944 Hrabak returned to JG 54, serving as its last Geschwaderkommodore until the end of the war. His greatest contribution to the Luftwaffe was not his combat record however but his command,  tactical and leadership qualities, which endeared him to the men under his command and sealed his reputation within the Luftwaffe leadership.

Later life
In 1956, he commanded the Advanced Pilot Training Center at Fürstenfeldbruck. In 1962, he took charge of the air defense covering northern Germany and the Netherlands. In 1964, he was named NATO's Chief of Air Defense/Central Europe until becoming special manager for the Lockheed F-104 Starfighter programme. As a major general, he commanded the GAF's tactical command. Hrabak died on 15 September 1995.

Summary of career

Aerial victory claims
According to US historian David T. Zabecki, Hrabak was credited with 125 aerial victories. Spick also lists Hrabak with 125 aerial victories, claimed in 820 combat missions, 109 of which on the Eastern Front and 16 on the Western Front. Mathews and Foreman, authors of Luftwaffe Aces — Biographies and Victory Claims, researched the German Federal Archives and found documentation for 125 aerial victory claims, all of which confirmed. This number includes 109 on the Eastern Front and 16 on the Western Front.

Victory claims were logged to a map-reference (PQ = Planquadrat), for example "PQ 54291". These sectors were then subdivided into 36 smaller units to give a location area 3 × 4 km in size.

Awards
Iron Cross (1939)
 2nd class (15 September 1939)
 1st class (28 May 1940)
Honour Goblet of the Luftwaffe (28 September 1940)
German Cross in Gold on 10 July 1944 as Oberstleutnant in Jagdgeschwader 52
Knight's Cross of the Iron Cross with Oak Leaves
 Knight's Cross on 21 October 1940 as Hauptmann and Gruppenkommandeur of the II./Jagdgeschwader 54
 337th Oak Leaves on 25 November 1943 as Oberstleutnant and Geschwaderkommodore of Jagdgeschwader 52

Notes

References

Citations

Bibliography

 
 
 
 
 
 
 
 
 
 
 
 
 
 
 
 
 
 
 
 
 
 
 
 

1914 births
1995 deaths
People from Böhlen
Luftwaffe pilots
German World War II flying aces
Recipients of the Gold German Cross
Recipients of the Knight's Cross of the Iron Cross with Oak Leaves
Commanders Crosses of the Order of Merit of the Federal Republic of Germany
Bundeswehr generals
Major generals of the German Air Force
People from the Kingdom of Saxony
Reichsmarine personnel
Military personnel from Saxony